George Webbe (by 1509 – 1556), of Canterbury, Kent, was an English politician.

Active in the local politics of Canterbury, he was a common councilman of the city by 1537, sheriff for 1537–38, an alderman in 1540, and mayor for 1552–53. He was appointed a commissioner for goods of churches and fraternities in 1553.

In March 1553, he was a Member of Parliament for Canterbury.

He married twice; firstly Anne, with whom he had 6 sons including Anthony and 6 daughters, and secondly Margaret.

References

 

1556 deaths
People from Canterbury
Sheriffs of Canterbury
Mayors of Canterbury
English MPs 1553 (Edward VI)
Year of birth uncertain